The Trafalgar Cup is a greyhound competition held at Monmore Green Stadium for puppies under the age of two. It is the oldest puppy competition in the racing calendar.

It was contested at Wembley Stadium from 1929 until 1998, but when the Wembley Greyhounds ended it moved to Oxford Stadium in 1999 and then on to Monmore Green Stadium in 2015.

Past winners

Venues & Distances 
 1929-1974 (Wembley 525y)
 1975-1998 (Wembley 490m)
 1999-2012 (Oxford 450m)
 2015–present (Monmore 480m)

Sponsors
 1999-2001 (William Hill Bookmakers)
 2002-2006 (Mike Allan Bookmakers)
 2008-2009 (Pattinson Construction)
 2007, 2010-2011 (Stadium Bookmakers)
 2012-2012 (Mick Lowe)
 2015-2018 (Kevin Perisi)
2019–present (Ladbrokes)

References

Greyhound racing competitions in the United Kingdom
Sport in Oxfordshire
Sport in Wolverhampton
Events at Wembley Stadium
Sport in the London Borough of Brent
Greyhound racing in London